Bernarda Pera was the defending champion, but chose not to participate.

Fiona Ferro won the title, defeating Karolína Muchová in the final, 6–4, 6–4.

Seeds

Draw

Finals

Top half

Bottom half

References
Main Draw

ITS Cup - Singles
ITS Cup